Vandre (वान्द्रे / बान्द्रा) Vidhan Sabha seat, a.k.a. Bandra, was one of the seats in Maharashtra Legislative Assembly in India. It was made defunct after constituency map of India was redrawn in 2008.

Members of Legislative Assembly

Election Results

1962 Assembly Election
 Purushottam Ganesh Kher (INC) : 45,235 votes    
 Arthur William Felix Menezes (SWA) : 14,548

1990 Assembly Election
 Salim Zakaria (INC) : 34,251 votes    
 Ramdas Nayak (BJP) : 30,086

1995 Assembly Election
 Jayashree Ramdas Nayak (BJP) : 32,887 votes    
 Salim Zakaria (INC) : 24,621

2004 Assembly Election
 Baba Jiyauddin Siddiki (INC) : 44,517 votes  
 Shaina Nana Chudasama (BJP) : 25,877

See also 
 List of constituencies of Maharashtra Legislative Assembly

References 

Former assembly constituencies of Maharashtra